Amanganj is a town and a Nagar Panchayat and a tehsil in Panna district in the state of Madhya Pradesh, India.

Geography
Amanganj has an average elevation of 329 metres (1,079 feet).

Demographics
As of the 2011 Census of India, The Amanganj town is divided into 16 wards for which elections are held every five years. The Amanganj Nagar Panchayat has population of 13,886 of which 7,293 are males while 6,593 are females.

Population of children with age of 0-6 is 1,969 which is 14.18% of total population of Amanganj (NP). In Amanganj Nagar Panchayat, female sex ratio is of 904 against state average of 931. Child sex ratio in Amanganj is around 989 compared to the Madhya Pradesh state average of 918. Literacy rate of Amanganj is 77.56% higher than state average of 69.32%. In Amanganj, male literacy is around 83.64% while female literacy rate is 70.73%.

References

Cities and towns in Panna district